In mathematics, the Bombieri–Vinogradov theorem (sometimes simply called Bombieri's theorem) is a major result of analytic number theory, obtained in the mid-1960s, concerning the distribution of primes in arithmetic progressions, averaged over a range of moduli. The first result of this kind was obtained by Mark Barban in 1961 and the Bombieri–Vinogradov theorem is a refinement of Barban's result. The Bombieri–Vinogradov theorem is named after Enrico Bombieri and A. I. Vinogradov, who published on a related topic, the density hypothesis, in 1965.

This result is a major application of the large sieve method, which developed rapidly in the early 1960s, from its beginnings in work of Yuri Linnik two decades earlier. Besides Bombieri, Klaus Roth was working in this area. In the late 1960s and early 1970s, many of the key ingredients and estimates were simplified by Patrick X. Gallagher.

Statement of the Bombieri–Vinogradov theorem
Let  and  be any two positive real numbers with
 

Then

Here  is the Euler totient function, which is the number of summands for the modulus q, and

where  denotes the von Mangoldt function.

This is not obvious, and without the averaging is about of the strength of the Generalized Riemann Hypothesis (GRH).

See also
Elliott–Halberstam conjecture (a generalization of Bombieri–Vinogradov)
Vinogradov's theorem (named after Ivan Matveyevich Vinogradov)

Notes

External links

The Bombieri-Vinogradov Theorem, R.C. Vaughan's Lecture note.

Sieve theory
Theorems in analytic number theory